Reuven Atar (born January 3, 1969) is a retired Israeli football player who was mostly known for his career in Maccabi Haifa and now he works as the manager of Bnei Lod. As a manager, he is mostly known for his work with Maccabi Netanya.

Early life
Atar was born in Tirat Carmel, Israel, to Sephardic Jewish immigrant parents from Iraq. During his adolescence, he played football for the Maccabi Haifa youth club. For many, he is one of the greatest players to ever wear the Haifa colors.

Professional career
After playing eight seasons for Maccabi Haifa and winning three titles for the club (The Toto Cup, and the Israeli Cup twice – one of which as both a Cup and a championship title at the same year), he joined the local rival team – Hapoel Haifa for four seasons, before being signed off to Beitar Jerusalem.  At Beitar he played only one match before being injured, which rendered him unable to play during the rest of the season.

In the next season, Atar moved to Hapoel Petah Tikva for a single season, before moving back to Hapoel Haifa and a few months later back to Beitar Jerusalem, where he became one of the most popular players.  In 2000, he returned to Maccabi Haifa, winning two championships. Atar left Haifa for Maccabi Netanya before the 2002/03 season, the last team in his professional career as a player.

Coaching career
During the season in Netanya, Atar was injured and decided to retire from his career as a player. He quickly signed as assistant coach in Netanya, first alongside Gili Landau and later on Eli Cohen. At the end of the 2003/04 season, Cohen has left the club, and Atar was chosen as the club's head-coach. Even though the M.C Netanya was relegated at the end of that season to the second league in Israel, "Liga Leumit",  Atar remained in his position and helped the club return to the Premier League after only one season.  In 2006, Atar was sent home by Netanya's new manager, Eyal Berkovich, and proceeded to move and coach Maccabi Herzliya, from which he was fired after only 8 league games before returning to Netanya, later guiding the club to the second place in the Israeli Premier League, and the UEFA Cup Qualifying rounds.

Atar was later dismissed from Netanya, after team's owner Daniel Jammer signed Lothar Matthäus.

In September 2008, he signed for Beitar replacing Shum. Later that year he won the Israeli Cup, but was dismissed and replaced by Shum.

On September 29, 2009, Atar returned once again to Maccabi Netanya, making it his 3rd stint as the manager of the club. On May 7, 2011, he broke Netanya's undefeated streak from 1971 as he managed the team for 16 straight games without losing a single game.

On April 23, 2012, he signed a two years contract for his home club of Maccabi Haifa. In November 13 he was sacked from Haifa.

On March 19, 2013, he returned to Maccabi Netanya for his 4th stint as the manager of the club.

In the start of the 2014–15 season he worked as the manager of Hapoel Haifa. He was fired after 4 months on the job.

On November 6, 2015, Atar returned to Maccabi Netanya for his 5th stint as the manager of the club.

Honours

Player 

Maccabi Haifa
Winner
Israeli Premier League : 1988–89, 1990–91, 1993–94, 2000–01, 2001–02
State Cup : 1991, 1993
Toto Cup : 1993–94, 2001–02
Runner-up
State Cup : 1987, 1989, 2002

Hapoel Haifa
Runner-up
Israeli Premier League : 1994–95, 1995–96

Manager 

Maccabi Netanya
Toto Cup (Leumit): Winner : 2004–05
Israeli Second Division : Runner-up : 2004–05
Israeli Premier League: Runner-up : 2006–07, 2007–08

Beitar Jerusalem
State Cup : Winner : 2009

career statistics

Club

International

International goals

Managerial stats

References

External links
 

1969 births
Living people
Israeli Sephardi Jews
Israeli footballers
Footballers from Tirat Carmel
Israel international footballers
Beitar Jerusalem F.C. players
Maccabi Haifa F.C. players
Hapoel Haifa F.C. players
Hapoel Petah Tikva F.C. players
Maccabi Netanya F.C. players
Israeli football managers
Maccabi Netanya F.C. managers
Maccabi Herzliya F.C. managers
Maccabi Haifa F.C. managers
Hapoel Bnei Lod F.C. managers
Israeli Premier League managers
Israeli people of Moroccan-Jewish descent
Liga Leumit players
Israeli Premier League players
Association football midfielders